Richard Marsh is a retired semi-professional rugby league footballer who played in the 1980s. He played at club level for Featherstone Rovers and Bramley.

Playing career

Club career
Richard Marsh made his début for Featherstone Rovers on Sunday 30 August 1981, during his time at Featherstone Rovers he scored three 3-point tries, and twenty 4-point tries.

References

External links
Stanley Rangers ARLFC - Roll of Honour

1962 births
Living people
Bramley RLFC players
English rugby league players
Featherstone Rovers players
Place of birth missing (living people)
Rugby league centres
Rugby league wingers